fX Sudirman previously known as Lifestyle X'nter (fX) is a shopping mall in Jakarta, Indonesia. The mall is spread across the first eight floors of the building, and includes fashion, food, beauty, entertainment and business meeting facilities. It stands on a land operated by the Gelora Bung Karno Complex Management Center, who also operates the nearby Gelora Bung Karno Sports Complex.

The building also contains apartments above the mall level 8, including hotel accommodation by Harris Hotel.  The tenth floor contains a gym, pool and tennis court. The complex along with the mall and apartment tower, was known as Sudirman Place from 2006 to 2008. The apartment tower is 213 meters tall and one of the tallest apartment tower in Jakarta. The apartment tower was known as The Pinnacle from 2006 to 2008, which is now named as FX Residence.

History 
fX Sudirman was first established and officially open in February 2006 as Sudirman Place by PT Aneka Bina Lestari who manages it with a concept that melds family mall and boutique mall.  Although there were already two big malls (Senayan City and Plaza Senayan) close to the area, the owner was confident that the mall going to be very successful considering its strategic location, being easily reached from patrons arriving from several direction. When it was first established, around a hundred tenants agreed to open in the new mall, however less than ten tenants opened at the launch, namely Nichols Edward, Bali Deli, Zuma and Starbucks. Most of the tenants cancelled their agreement to open in the mall, or closed soon after opening because the mall suffered from a lack of visitors. According to Bagus Y. Prastowo, GM Advertising and Promotion FX Plaza, the family mall concept with 100 tenants wouldn't work because its size (30 thousand m2) was as too small compared to the other malls close by with 150 thousand m2 space.

Sudirman Place officially closed in November 2006. The building management was then taken over by PT Plaza Lifestyle Prima (Group PT Plaza Indonesia Realty Tbk/PIR) who saw potential based on its location, provided it could be positioned in the market as complementary to the malls nearby.  After three months comparative study, a further six months was taken to create the new concept for the mall. The new management uses overseas building designer Denton Corker Marshall and its architect Budiman (Principal Architect), the same company who designed Plaza eX. After actively promoting it creatively and intensively, Henny Udi Marketing Director from PT Plaza Lifestyle Prima as the sister company of Plaza Indonesia Realty (PIR) manages to increase tenant occupancy rate from 25 percent to 97 percent.

It is reopened in July 2008 as fX Plaza. The previous tenants were encouraged to stay with one condition that they should follow the "new concept", or their contracts were settled "peacefully", according to Henny Udi (Leasing Director). When it is first opened, the new concept manages to attract five thousand visitors daily to the mall.  The mall provided 20 Mbit/s free wifi in every floor. with over 200 access points.  and Atmosfear Slide was added to the mall. the slide designed by Legacy Entertainment.

In June 2011, the apartment is taken over by Tauzia Hotel Management and operated its seventh hotel chain (Harris Hotel) and introduce it as "Harris Suites" inside fX Sudirman. It has 88 rooms and uses an already established facility for the apartment.

In July 2012, the mall celebrates four years since the reopening.

Land dispute 

fX building is part of land dispute surrounding Gelora Bung Karno area. According to Hakam Naja as the Head of Indonesia Country Asset Working Committee the funding received from fX mall is supposed to go to the country's asset instead of Indonesian National Sport Committee (KONI).

Bomb threat
In November 2008, the building received a bomb threat sent to Indonesian police SMS number 1717, U.S. Embassy and Australian Embassy.

fPod 
When it is re opens in mid 2008 the building "new concept" also offered 11 closed meeting places known as "fPod".  Each fPod has a different design, by 10 Indonesian national and international architects, including Ridwan Kamil, Leonard Theosabatra, Alvin Tjitowirjo, Willis Kusuma and Avianti Armand. fPod include audio-visual equipment, wifi, and songs for guests wishing to use the fPod for karaoke.

Events 

fX was the venue for Social Media Festival (SocMedFest) 22–24 September 2011, which attracted 3,000 attendees, making it the largest social media festival in Indonesia,  and featured a broad range of organisations using social media effectively, from commercial enterprise to non-profit humanitarian purposes.

From 8 September 2012, idol group JKT48 perform regularly in their theater which set on its fourth floor.

References

External links 

 
 FX Jakarta, Harris Hotels

Shopping malls in Jakarta
Shopping malls established in 2008
South Jakarta